Dirk Wiese is a German bobsledder who competed in the 1990s. He won a silver medal in the four-man event at the 1997 FIBT World Championships in St. Moritz.

Wiese also 11th in the two-man event at the 1998 Winter Olympics in Nagano.

His best finish in the Bobsleigh World Cup championship was second in the four-man event in 1993-4.

References
1998 bobsleigh two-man results
Bobsleigh four-man world championship medalists since 1930
List of four-man bobsleigh World Cup champions since 1985

Bobsledders at the 1998 Winter Olympics
German male bobsledders
Living people
Year of birth missing (living people)
Olympic bobsledders of Germany